The Basilica of Guadalupe or Santuario de Nuestra Señora de Guadalupe, has a fifty five gold crowns inside. is a Roman Catholic church located in the metropolitan area of Monterrey, Nuevo León, Mexico. Standing in the neighborhood of Colonia Independencia, just outside the city's downtown area, the temple is one of the larger Church edifices in northern Mexico. It is dedicated to Virgin Mary in her guise as Our Lady of Guadalupe, the Patroness of America, who appeared to St Juan Diego on Tepeyac Hill outside Mexico City in 1531.

It is smaller than its counterpart, the Basilica of Our Lady of Guadalupe in Mexico City, which has a more national and international fame.

Year after year, the church becomes the destination for thousands of faithfuls devoted to the Virgin, especially on the days prior to her feast day, December 12. On that date, beginning at the stroke of midnight leading into the 12th, mariachis play and sing traditional songs, or the mañanitas, paying tribute to the Virgin.

Usually, the weeks prior to Our Lady's holiday, pilgrimages are made by peregrinos who arrive praying or chanting, and matachines who dance all the way up to the basilica. They all emerge from various directions to converge onto the church to pray and hear Mass in front of the copy of the  image of the Guadalupana.  The original is in the Mexico City basilica.

Other notable Catholic churches in the area are: Catedral de Monterrey (The Monterrey Cathedral), La Basilica de la Purísima Concepcion - commonly known as "La Purisima", Capilla de los Dulces Nombres (the Chapel of the Sweet Names), San Juan Bautista de La Salle, Basilica de Nuestra Senora del Roble, El Sagrado Corazon (Sacred Heart) and the Antigua Basilica de Guadalupe (Old Basilica).

Gallery

See also
List of basilicas
Our Lady of Guadalupe
Basilica of Our Lady of Guadalupe

References

Buildings and structures in Monterrey
Shrines to the Virgin Mary
Roman Catholic churches in Mexico
Basilica churches in Mexico
Our Lady of Guadalupe
Tourist attractions in Monterrey